Asura postbicolor is a moth of the family Erebidae first described by Walter Rothschild in 1913.

References

postbicolor